Jon Heidenreich (born June 28, 1972) is an American retired professional wrestler, better known simply as Heidenreich. He is best known for his tenure with World Wrestling Entertainment (WWE) on its SmackDown brand where he was a one time Tag Team Champion with Road Warrior Animal as a part of the 2005 version of the  Legion of Doom.

American football career
Prior to professional wrestling, Heidenreich played American football and was invited to training camp prior to the 1992 season by the defending Super Bowl XXVI Champion Washington Redskins as an undrafted rookie offensive tackle out of Northeast Louisiana University, which later became University of Louisiana at Monroe in 1999. Heidenreich was among the first round of roster cuts by head coach Joe Gibbs on July 27, 1992.

One week before training camp began in July 1993, Heidenreich signed with the New Orleans Saints and outspoken Head Coach Jim E. Mora. Mora had liked what he saw in Heidenreich during a late-June tryout to fill a training camp roster spot while standout offensive lineman Jim Dombrowski held out until signing a five-year contract worth $11.25 million on August 13, one week before training camp ended. On the first day of camp, Heidenreich (wearing jersey #65) was involved in a fight with teammate and Saints defensive lineman Rick Dolly in the morning session. In the afternoon session, Heidenreich was involved in another skirmish when he grabbed Saints outside linebacker and 1990 first-round draft pick Renaldo Turnbull from behind and threw him to the ground after Turnbull had just beaten him on a move to the outside. Heidenreich was cut on August 24, 1993, the final day of roster cuts to meet the mandatory 60-player requirement.

In July 1994, Heidenreich was invited to training camp by first-year Atlanta Falcons Head Coach June Jones. This time Heidenreich wore jersey #74 and was often tasked with blocking fellow WWE wrestler Bill Goldberg, who played defensive tackle for the Falcons from 1992 to 1994. Heidenreich was again denied a final roster spot when the Falcons cut him on the final day of roster cuts on August 23, 1994.

He played as an offensive lineman for two seasons (1994 and 1995) in the Canadian Football League for the Shreveport Pirates before playing for the Texas Terror of the Arena Football League (AFL) in 1996 and the Frankfurt Galaxy of NFL Europa in 1997.

Professional wrestling career

Early career (2001–2003)
Heidenreich began training at California-based Ultimate Pro Wrestling before he was first signed to a World Wrestling Federation developmental contract in 2001 after he impressed Bruce Prichard. After being released from the WWF, he wrestled in Japan's Pro Wrestling ZERO1-MAX promotion, where he won the NWA Intercontinental Tag Team Championship with Nathan Jones and impressed WWE scouts, who re-signed him in 2003.

World Wrestling Entertainment (2003-2006)

Early years (2003–2004) 
Heidenreich made his return to the now-renamed World Wrestling Entertainment (WWE) on the September 29, 2003 episode of Raw, making his formal debut with a gimmick being "controlled" by an entity known as "Little Johnny". After weeks of trying secure a tryout match, he was finally granted one on the October 27 episode of Raw, teaming with The Hurricane to defeat La Resistance. On the November 3 episode of Raw, he teamed with Trish Stratus to defeat Victoria and Stevie Richards. Over the next month, Heidenreich remained undefeated, before his streak was snapped by Rico on the December 14 edition of Sunday Night Heat before Armageddon. On the February 8, 2004 episode of Heat, Heidenreich was kissed by Rob Van Dam. After wrestling a few more times, Heidenreich disappeared from WWE television around May 2004.

In an interview with ThePainClinic.net in 2007, Heidenreich revealed that "Little Johnny" was actually meant to be a small doll that represented his inner child who was still angry at being born in a charity hospital. He stated that he used the character in OVW and brought the doll out to the ring with him in the same vein as Al Snow used to bring out the styrofoam head. According to Heidenreich, the angle was supposedly inspired by his own childhood where he spoke to a doll himself at one point.

In 2008, former WWE writer Dan Madigan revealed that in 2004 he had pitched directly to Vince McMahon an idea to have Heidenreich return as a Nazi stormtrooper named Baron Von Bava, who had been cryogenically frozen before being revived by Paul Heyman (a Jewish son of a Holocaust survivor), complete with Heidenreich wearing the red armband with the swastika and even goose-stepping to the ring. While WWE would eventually have Heyman manage Heidenreich, the pitch was considered so shocking that McMahon left the board room speechless and didn't return for the rest of the day. The pitch led to Madigan leaving WWE later that year.

Feuding with The Undertaker (2004–2005) 

He returned on the August 26, 2004 episode of SmackDown! as a heel under the management of Paul Heyman. His new gimmick was as a psychopath: running in during random matches, attacking fans, and reciting hateful poetry, which he referred to as "Disasterpieces." On the September 16 episode of SmackDown!, he attacked commentator Michael Cole and dragged him backstage and forcibly read poetry to him. In a 2008 interview, Heidenreich explained that the Cole scare angle was McMahon's idea, and that Pulp Fiction came to mind when Stephanie McMahon approached him with the idea.

His first feud came against The Undertaker, and began after Heidenreich ran in during Undertaker's WWE Championship match against John "Bradshaw" Layfield at No Mercy. Undertaker beat Heidenreich at the next month's Survivor Series, but again Heidenreich cost him a WWE Championship match at December's Armageddon when he interfered in the main event fatal four-way match not once, but twice. At WWE Tribute to the Troops on December 23, Heidenreich lost to the Undertaker via countout. On the January 6, 2005 episode of SmackDown!, Heidenreich and Heyman lost to the Undertaker in a 2-on-1 handicap match, after Heyman was pinned. After the match, Heyman was placed in a casket by the Undertaker, writing him off television.

At Royal Rumble on January 30, he faced The Undertaker in a casket match. Midway through the match, Snitsky from the Raw brand interfered on Heidenreich's behalf. However, after opening the casket, it was revealed that Kane was hidden in the casket, who pounced on both Snitsky and Heidenreich; they continued their fight in the crowd, while Heidenreich lost the match. This started a chain reaction of feuds, originally planned to lead to a match at WrestleMania 21 in which The Undertaker would partner with Kane to take on Snitsky and Heidenreich. This idea was later nixed; Undertaker instead fought Randy Orton and Kane was placed into the Money in the Bank ladder match. The feud between the four instead culminated at a live event on February 6, with Undertaker and Kane getting the win.

Teaming with Animal and departure (2005–2006)

At No Way Out, Heidenreich lost to Booker T by disqualification after hitting Booker with a steel chair. On the March 3 episode of SmackDown!, Heidenreich faced Booker T in a rematch, which ended in a disqualification win for Heidenreich after Booker performed a DDT on a chair. Heidenreich and Booker faced once again on the March 10 episode of SmackDown! in a no disqualification match, which ended with Booker decisively defeating Heidenreich. On the March 17 episode of SmackDown!, Heidenreich read Booker a poem, thanking him for encouraging him to show the "real" Heidenreich, turning face in the process. Heidenreich participated in a 30-man battle royal at WrestleMania 21, which was won by Booker T.

His "disasterpieces" became more light-hearted and began receiving cheers from the crowd. Heidenreich was then given a segment on SmackDown! in which he "made friends" with audience members, read them a piece of his poetry, and had them stand in his corner during his match. He also had a brief feud with Orlando Jordan, unsuccessfully challenging him for the United States Championship at Judgment Day.

Heidenreich went on to feud with MNM (Melina, Johnny Nitro, and Joey Mercury) after they attacked him while he was eating chocolate with divas on the June 16 episode of SmackDown!. After being attacked week in and week out by the trio, he was finally helped out by Road Warrior Animal on the July 14 episode of SmackDown!. Animal and Heidenreich then challenged MNM to a match at the Great American Bash, where they defeated them to win the WWE Tag Team Championship.

On the July 28 episode of SmackDown!, Heidenreich reluctantly shaved his hair into a mohawk at Animal's request. After Animal convinced him he wasn't looking for a "replacement" for Road Warrior Hawk, but simply a partner with talent, Animal talked him into wearing face paint and, on the August 18 SmackDown!, he was made an "official" member of the Legion of Doom and presented with a pair of Road Warrior spikes. On the October 28 episode of SmackDown!, the Road Warriors lost the WWE Tag Team Championship back to MNM in a match also involving The Mexicools and William Regal and Paul Burchill. Heidenreich wrestled his final match, teaming up with Animal to defeat Nunzio and Vito, on the December 30 edition of Velocity.

On January 17, 2006, WWE announced that Heidenreich had been released from his contract.

World Wrestling Council (2006–2007)

After his run in the WWE, Heidenreich moved on to World Wrestling Council, where he defeated Abbad on October 28, 2006 to win the WWC Universal Heavyweight Championship, the top title in the Puerto Rico based promotion. Two months later he lost the title to Carlito at the Lockout event. However, he was given the title back when Carlito was stripped of the title due to Carlito's contractual compromises with World Wrestling Entertainment. He lost the title a second time to Eddie Colón, Carlito's brother, on January 6, 2007.

Independent circuit (2007–2009, 2016–2018)
After leaving the WWE, Heidenreich made his debut in All-American Wrestling, a Louisiana-based promotion on May 19, 2007, where he defeated J.T. Lamotta. On May 18, 2008, he teamed with Rodney Mack to defeat Latinos Locos for the promotion's Tag Team Championship. However, the title was vacated soon afterwards due to interference in the original title match. On December 14, Heidenreich won the promotion's Heavyweight Championship in a three way Loser Leaves AAW match involving then-champion The Angel of Sinn and Haniel, in which he pinned Angel to win the title. He retired from professional wrestling soon after.

Heidenreich wrestled several matches in 2016, including for New York-based promotion Warriors of Wrestling on June 11, 2016, against Juba. The match ended in a double disqualification. He faced off against a Doink the Clown impersonator at an event in a Golden Corral parking lot in May 2016, with the bizarre encounter gaining the attention of Wrestlecrap.

On November 12, 2017, Heidenreich won the 302 Wrestling Heavyweight Championship; however the title was immediately retired after his win.

Other media
Heidenreich participated in the wrestling film, Bloodstained Memoirs. He also appears as a playable character in WWE Day of Reckoning 2 and WWE SmackDown! vs. Raw 2006.

Personal life
Heidenreich and his wife, Marissa, have one son together.

In 2005, his home was damaged by Hurricane Katrina. In 2017, he had a cyst removed from his forehead.

In July 2016, Heidenreich was named part of a class action lawsuit filed against WWE which alleged that wrestlers incurred traumatic brain injuries during their tenure and that the company concealed the risks of injury. The suit was litigated by attorney Konstantine Kyros, who has been involved in a number of other lawsuits against WWE. The lawsuit was dismissed by US District Judge Vanessa Lynne Bryant in September 2018.

Championships and accomplishments
Despite what has been posted on various internet sites, Jon Heidenreich was not a member of the 1991 Washington Redskins Super Bowl XXVI Championship team. He was signed as a rookie free agent over three months later, in May 1992, after going undrafted in the 1992 NFL Draft.

Professional wrestling
302 Wrestling
302 Heavyweight Championship (1 time)
All American Wrestling (Louisiana)
AAW Heavyweight Championship (1 time)
AAW Tag Team Championship (1 time) – with Rodney Mack
American Wrestling Rampage
AWR No Limits Championship (1 time)
Bluegrass Championship Wrestling
BCW World Heavyweight Championship (1 time)
No Limit Wrestling
NLW Heavyweight Championship (1 time)
Over The Top Wrestling
OTT No Limits Championship (1 time)
Pro Wrestling ZERO1-MAX
NWA Intercontinental Tag Team Championship (1 time) – with Nathan Jones
Texas Wrestling Alliance
TWA Tag Team Championship (1 time) – with Busta
World Wrestling Council
WWC Universal Heavyweight Championship (2 times)
World Wrestling Entertainment
WWE Tag Team Championship (1 time) – with Road Warrior Animal

References

External links

Online World of Wrestling profile

1972 births
21st-century professional wrestlers
American football offensive linemen
American male professional wrestlers
American people of German descent
Frankfurt Galaxy players
Living people
Louisiana–Monroe Warhawks football players
Mississippi State Bulldogs football players
Players of American football from Louisiana
Professional wrestlers from California
Shreveport Pirates players
The Road Warriors members
WWC Universal Heavyweight Champions